Nobelman v. American Savings Bank, 508 U.S. 324 (1993), was a United States Supreme Court case in which the Court disallowed cram-downs (the involuntary imposition by a court of a reorganization plan over the objections of creditors in a bankruptcy proceeding) for primary residences. Michael J. Schroeder argued on behalf of the mortgage creditor, American Savings Bank.

External links 

1993 in United States case law
United States bankruptcy case law
United States Supreme Court cases
United States Supreme Court cases of the Rehnquist Court